Aaron Derek Ahmad Jarvis (born 24 January 1998) is an English professional footballer who plays as a striker.

Career

Basingstoke Town
Jarvis was born in Basingstoke, Hampshire. He signed a first-team contract with Basingstoke Town in May 2016, having progressed through the club's youth system.

Luton Town
On 31 August 2017, Jarvis signed for League Two club Luton Town on a one-year contract, with the option of a further year for an undisclosed fee. He made his debut as an 87th-minute substitute for James Collins in a 0–0 draw away to Morecambe on 26 September.

He joined National League club Boreham Wood on a one-month youth loan on 22 December, having made four appearances and scored one goal for Luton up to that point in 2017–18. Jarvis only made the starting lineup once for Boreham Wood, with three of his four appearances for the club coming as a substitute. He joined Scottish Championship club Falkirk on 31 January 2019 on loan until the end of 2018–19. Jarvis was released by Luton when his contract expired at the end of the 2018–19 season.

Sutton United
Jarvis signed for National League club Sutton United on 11 July 2019 on a contract of undisclosed length. He was loaned to National League South club Hemel Hempstead Town on 28 January 2020.

Scunthorpe United
He signed for League Two club Scunthorpe United on 3 August 2020 on a two-year contract. He was released by Scunthorpe at the end of the 2021–22 season.

Personal life
Prior to becoming a professional footballer with Luton Town, Jarvis was employed by Tesco.

Career statistics

References

External links
Profile at the Scunthorpe United F.C. website

1998 births
Living people
Sportspeople from Basingstoke
Footballers from Hampshire
English footballers
Association football forwards
Basingstoke Town F.C. players
Luton Town F.C. players
Boreham Wood F.C. players
Falkirk F.C. players
Sutton United F.C. players
Hemel Hempstead Town F.C. players
Scunthorpe United F.C. players
Torquay United F.C. players
National League (English football) players
Southern Football League players
English Football League players
Scottish Professional Football League players